is a subway station in Minato, Tokyo, operated jointly by the Tokyo subway operators Tokyo Metro and Tokyo Metropolitan Bureau of Transportation (Toei).

Lines 
It is the least used station on the Toei Subway network, with 5,070 boardings per day in 2018.

Station layout
The station has two underground side platforms on the fourth basement ("B4F") level, serving two tracks shared by both Tokyo Metro Namboku Line and the Toei Mita Line services.

Platforms

History
Shirokanedai Station opened on 26 September 2000.

The station facilities of the Namboku Line were inherited by Tokyo Metro after the privatization of the Teito Rapid Transit Authority (TRTA) in 2004.

Surrounding area
 Meiji Gakuin University Shirokane Campus
 Meiji Gakuin Senior High School
 Institute of Medical Science
 The Institute for Nature Study
 Matsuoka Museum

See also
 List of railway stations in Japan

References

External links

 Tokyo Metro station information 
 Toei station information 

Railway stations in Tokyo
Railway stations in Japan opened in 2000
Toei Mita Line
Tokyo Metro Namboku Line
Buildings and structures in Minato, Tokyo